The Echiniscoididae are a family of tardigrades, water-dwelling, eight-legged, segmented micro-animals. It is one of the four families in the Echiniscoidea order.

The family of Echiniscoididae consists of the following subfamilies and genera:
Echiniscoidinae Kristensen & Hallas, 1980
Anisonyches Pollock, 1975
Echiniscoides Plate, 1888
Isoechiniscoidinae Møbjerg, Kristensen & Jørgensen, 2016
Isoechiniscoides Møbjerg, Kristensen & Jørgensen, 2016

References

 
Tardigrade families